Bessie Potter can refer to:

Bessie Potter (1872–1955), American sculptor better known as Bessie Potter Vonnoh
Bessie Potter, fictional character on television series Dawson's Creek